Michael Edison Brown is an Australian politician. He has been a Labor member of the South Australian House of Assembly since the 2018 state election. He represented Playford from 2018 to 2022 after which he transferred to Florey at the 2022 state election.

Previously state secretary of the Labor Party, Brown worked before his election as Premier Jay Weatherill's chief of staff.

References

Members of the South Australian House of Assembly
Year of birth missing (living people)
Living people
Australian Labor Party members of the Parliament of South Australia
21st-century Australian politicians